Anders Torleif Mattias Bäckström Johansson (born 25 July 1985) is a Swedish politician of the Sweden Democrats. He has served as Deputy Leader of the Sweden Democrats in the Riksdag since 2019. He has been Member of the Riksdag since September 2014, representing Västernorrland County 2014–2018 and Kalmar County from 2018 onwards. He currently takes up seat number 34 in the Riksdag.

Biography
Bäckström Johansson studied marine engineering at the Kalmar Maritime University (a branch of Linnaeus University) and worked as a power station reactor operator at the Oskarshamn Nuclear Power Plant.

He is a member of the municipal council for Oskarshamn Municipality for the Sweden Democrats, having first been elected in 2006. From 2010 until 2014 Bäckström Johansson was also a member of the regional council for Kalmar County. 

He was first elected to the Riksdag during the 2014 Swedish general election and has been a member of the Industry and Trade Committee since.

References

External links
Mattias Bäckström Johansson at the Riksdag 

Living people
1985 births
21st-century Swedish politicians
Members of the Riksdag from the Sweden Democrats
People from Järfälla Municipality
Members of the Riksdag 2014–2018
Members of the Riksdag 2018–2022
Members of the Riksdag 2022–2026